A host is a person responsible for guests at an event or for providing hospitality during it.

Host may also refer to:

Places 
Host, Pennsylvania, a village in Berks County

People
Jim Host (born 1937), American businessman
Michel Host (1942–2021), French writer
"Host", an author abbreviation in botany for Nicolaus Thomas Host

Arts, entertainment, and media

Fictional entities
Hosts (World of Darkness), fictional characters in game Werewolf: The Forsaken
Hosts, alien invaders and overlords in the TV series Colony
Avenging Host, a group of characters in Marvel Comics' Earth X series of comic books
Rutan Host, fictional aliens from Doctor Who

Film
 Host (film), a 2020 horror film directed by Rob Savage

Literature
Host, the third novel in the Rogue Mage series by Faith Hunter
Host, a 1993 book by Peter James
Hosts (novel), a 2001 book written by American author F. Paul Wilson

Music
H.O.S.T., an influential hip-hop group in Azerbaijan
Host (Critters Buggin album), 1996
Host (Paradise Lost album), 1999
Host (Cults album), 2020
"Host", a song from the b-side of the 1999 single "Cave" by Muse

Computing and technology 
Host (network), a computer providing services
hosts (file), mapping hostnames to IP addresses
host (Unix), a command
Internet hosting service
Virtual host, hosting multiple domain names on a single server
In hardware virtualization a host machine runs a virtual machine
 UOL HOST, a webhosting service

Groups or formations 
Cossack host, military formations of Eastern Europe
Hueste, or host, a type of military force in the Iberian Peninsula and France during the Middle Ages
Furious Host or the Wild Hunt, a European folk myth

Religion
Heavenly host, an "army" of good angels in Heaven
Lord of hosts, a common epithet of the God of the Old Testament
Sacramental bread, called the host or hostia, used in Christian liturgy

Roles
Host (radio), the presenter or announcer on a radio show
Television presenter, the host or announcer on a television show
Casino host
Host, a paid male companion at a host club offering conversation and entertainment, primarily in East Asia
Maître d'hôtel (Maître d') or head waiter of a restaurant or hotel
Master of ceremonies
Talk show host, a presenter of a TV or radio talk show

Science
Host (biology), an organism harboring another organism or organisms on or in itself
Host (psychology), personality as emphasized in treating dissociative identity disorder
Host (astronomy), the interactions and analysis of a star-planet relationship

See also 
Hostess (disambiguation)
Hosting (disambiguation)
The Host (disambiguation)